An architectural drawing or architect's drawing is a technical drawing of a building (or building project) that falls within the definition of architecture. Architectural drawings are used by architects and others for a number of purposes: to develop a design idea into a coherent proposal, to communicate ideas and concepts, to convince clients of the merits of a design, to assist a building contractor to construct it based on design intent, as a record of the design and planned development, or to make a record of a building that already exists.

Architectural drawings are made according to a set of conventions, which include particular views (floor plan, section etc.), sheet sizes, units of measurement and scales, annotation and cross referencing.

Historically, drawings were made in ink on paper or similar material, and any copies required had to be laboriously made by hand. The twentieth century saw a shift to drawing on tracing paper so that mechanical copies could be run off efficiently. The development of the computer had a major impact on the methods used to design and create technical drawings, making manual drawing almost obsolete, and opening up new possibilities of form using organic shapes and complex geometry. Today the vast majority of drawings are created using CAD software.

Size and scale

The size of drawings reflects the materials available and the size that is convenient to transport – rolled up or folded, laid out on a table, or pinned up on a wall. The drafting process may impose limitations on the size that is realistically workable. Sizes are determined by a consistent paper size system, according to local usage. Normally the largest paper size used in modern architectural practice is ISO A0 or in the USA Arch E or Large E size.

Architectural drawings are drawn to scale so that relative sizes are correctly represented. The scale is chosen both to ensure the whole building will fit on the chosen sheet size and to show the required amount of detail. On the scale of one-eighth of an inch to one foot (1:96) or the metric equivalent of 1 to 100, walls are typically shown as simple outlines corresponding to the overall thickness. At a larger scale, half an inch to one foot (1:24) or the nearest common metric equivalent 1 to 20, the layers of different materials that make up the wall construction are shown. Construction details are drawn to a larger scale, in some cases full size (1 to 1 scale).

Scale drawings enable dimensions to be "read" off the drawing, i.e. measured directly. Imperial scales (feet and inches) are equally readable using an ordinary ruler. On a one-eighth inch to one-foot scale drawing, the one-eighth divisions on the ruler can be read off as feet. Architects normally use a scale ruler with different scales marked on each edge. A third method, used by builders in estimating, is to measure directly off the drawing and multiply by the scale factor.

Dimensions can be measured off drawings made on a stable medium such as vellum. All processes of reproduction introduce small errors, especially now that different copying methods mean that the same drawing may be re-copied, or copies made in several different ways. Consequently, dimensions need to be written ("figured") on the drawing. The disclaimer "Do not scale off dimensions" is commonly inscribed on architects' drawings, to guard against errors arising in the copying process.

Standard views used in architectural drawing
This section deals with the conventional views used to represent a building or structure. See the Types of architectural drawing section below for drawings classified according to their purpose.

Floor plan
A floor plan is the most fundamental architectural diagram, a view from above showing the arrangement of spaces in a building in the same way as a map, but showing the arrangement at a particular level of a building. Technically it is a horizontal section cut through a building (conventionally at four feet / one metre and twenty centimetres above floor level), showing walls, windows and door openings, and other features at that level. The plan view includes anything that could be seen below that level: the floor, stairs (but only up to the plan level), fittings, and sometimes furniture. Objects above the plan level (e.g. beams overhead) can be indicated as dashed lines.

Geometrically, plan view is defined as a vertical orthographic projection of an object onto a horizontal plane, with the horizontal plane cutting through the building.

Site plan
A site plan is a specific type of plan, showing the whole context of a building or group of buildings. A site plan shows property boundaries and means of access to the site, and nearby structures if they are relevant to the design. For a development on an urban site, the site plan may need to show adjoining streets to demonstrate how the design fits into the urban fabric. Within the site boundary, the site plan gives an overview of the entire scope of work. It shows the buildings (if any) already existing and those that are proposed, usually as a building footprint; roads, parking lots, footpaths, hard landscaping, trees, and planting. For a construction project, the site plan also needs to show all the services connections: drainage and sewer lines, water supply, electrical and communications cables, exterior lighting etc.

Site plans are commonly used to represent a building proposal prior to detailed design: drawing up a site plan is a tool for deciding both the site layout and the size and orientation of proposed new buildings. A site plan is used to verify that a proposal complies with local development codes, including restrictions on historical sites. In this context the site plan forms part of a legal agreement, and there may be a requirement for it to be drawn up by a licensed professional: architect, engineer, landscape architect or land surveyor.

Elevation
An elevation is a view of a building seen from one side, a flat representation of one façade. This is the most common view used to describe the external appearance of a building. Each elevation is labelled in relation to the compass direction it faces, e.g. looking toward the north you would be seeing the southern elevation of the building. Buildings are rarely a simple rectangular shape in plan, so a typical elevation may show all the parts of the building that are seen from a particular direction.

Geometrically, an elevation is a horizontal orthographic projection of a building onto a vertical plane, the vertical plane normally being parallel to one side of the building.

Architects also use the word elevation as a synonym for façade, so the "north elevation" is the north-facing wall of the building.

Cross section
A cross section, also simply called a section, represents a vertical plane cut through the object, in the same way as a floor plan is a horizontal section viewed from the top. In the section view, everything cut by the section plane is shown as a bold line, often with a solid fill to show objects that are cut through, and anything seen beyond generally shown in a thinner line. Sections are used to describe the relationship between different levels of a building. In the Observatorium drawing illustrated here, the section shows the dome which can be seen from the outside, a second dome that can only be seen inside the building, and the way the space between the two accommodates a large astronomical telescope: relationships that would be difficult to understand from plans alone.

A sectional elevation is a combination of a cross section, with elevations of other parts of the building seen beyond the section plane.

Geometrically, a cross section is a horizontal orthographic projection of a building on to a vertical plane, with the vertical plane cutting through the building.

Isometric and axonometric projections
Isometric and axonometric projections are a simple way of representing a three dimensional object, keeping the elements to scale and showing the relationship between several sides of the same object, so that the complexities of a shape can be clearly understood.

There is some confusion over the distinction between the terms isometric and axonometric. "Axonometric is a word that has been used by architects for hundreds of years. Engineers use the word axonometric as a generic term to include isometric, diametric and trimetric drawings." This article uses the terms in the architecture-specific sense.

Despite fairly complex geometrical explanations, for the purposes of practical drafting the difference between isometric and axonometric is simple (see diagram above). In both, the plan is drawn on a skewed or rotated grid, and the verticals are projected vertically on the page. All lines are drawn to scale so that relationships between elements are accurate. In many cases a different scale is required for different axes, and again this can be calculated but in practice was often simply estimated by eye.
 An isometric uses a plan grid at 30 degrees from the horizontal in both directions, which distorts the plan shape. Isometric graph paper can be used to construct this kind of drawing. This view is useful to explain construction details (e.g. three dimensional joints in joinery). The isometric was the standard view until the mid twentieth century, remaining popular until the 1970s, especially for textbook diagrams and illustrations.
 Cabinet projection is similar, but only one axis is skewed, the others being horizontal and vertical. Originally used in cabinet making, the advantage is that a principal side (e.g. a cabinet front) is displayed without distortion, so only the less important sides are skewed. The lines leading away from the eye are drawn at a reduced scale to lessen the degree of distortion. The cabinet projection is seen in Victorian engraved advertisements and architectural textbooks, but has virtually disappeared from general use.
 An axonometric uses a 45-degree plan grid, which keeps the original orthogonal geometry of the plan. The great advantage of this view for architecture is that the draftsman can work directly from a plan, without having to reconstruct it on a skewed grid. In theory the plan should be set at 45 degrees, but this introduces confusing coincidences where opposite corners align. Unwanted effects can be avoided by rotating the plan while still projecting vertically. This is sometimes called a planometric or plan oblique view, and allows freedom to choose any suitable angle to present the most useful view of an object.

Traditional drafting techniques used 30–60 and 45 degree set squares, and that determined the angles used in these views. Once the adjustable square became common those limitations were lifted.

The axonometric gained in popularity in the twentieth century, not just as a convenient diagram but as a formal presentation technique, adopted in particular by the Modern Movement. Axonometric drawings feature prominently in the influential 1970's drawings of Michael Graves, James Stirling and others, using not only straightforward views but worms-eye view, unusually and exaggerated rotations of the plan, and exploded elements.

The axonometric view is not readily generated by CAD programmes which create views from a three dimensional model. Consequently, it is now rarely used.

Detail drawings
Detail drawings show a small part of the construction at a larger scale, to show how the component parts fit together. They are also used to show small surface details, for example decorative elements. Section drawings at large scale are a standard way of showing building construction details, typically showing complex junctions (such as floor to wall junction, window openings, eaves and roof apex) that cannot be clearly shown on a drawing that includes the full height of the building. A full set of construction details needs to show plan details as well as vertical section details. One detail is seldom produced in isolation: a set of details shows the information needed to understand the construction in three dimensions. Typical scales for details are 1/10, 1/5 and full size.

In traditional construction, many details were so fully standardized, that few detail drawings were required to construct a building. For example, the construction of a sash window would be left to the carpenter, who would fully understand what was required, but unique decorative details of the façade would be drawn up in detail. In contrast, modern buildings need to be fully detailed because of the proliferation of different products, methods and possible solutions.

Architectural perspective

Perspective in drawing is an approximate representation on a flat surface of an image as it is perceived by the eye. The key concepts here are:
 Perspective is the view from a particular fixed viewpoint.
 Horizontal and vertical edges in the object are represented by horizontals and verticals in the drawing.
 Lines leading away into the distance appear to converge at a vanishing point.
 All horizontals converge to a point on the horizon, which is a horizontal line at eye level.
 Verticals converge to a point either above or below the horizon.

The basic categorization of artificial perspective is by the number of vanishing points:
 One-point perspective where objects facing the viewer are orthogonal, and receding lines converge to a single vanishing point.
 Two-point perspective reduces distortion by viewing objects at an angle, with all the horizontal lines receding to one of two vanishing points, both located on the horizon.
 Three-point perspective introduces additional realism by making the verticals recede to a third vanishing point, which is above or below depending upon whether the view is seen from above or below.

The normal convention in architectural perspective is to use two-point perspective, with all the verticals drawn as verticals on the page.

Three-point perspective gives a casual, photographic snapshot effect. In professional architectural photography, conversely, a view camera or a perspective control lens is used to eliminate the third vanishing point, so that all the verticals are vertical on the photograph, as with the perspective convention. This can also be done by digital manipulation of a photograph taken with a standard lens.

Aerial perspective is a technique in painting, for indicating distance by approximating the effect of the atmosphere on distant objects. In daylight, as an ordinary object gets further from the eye, its contrast with the background is reduced, its color saturation is reduced, and its color becomes more blue. Not to be confused with aerial view or bird's eye view, which is the view as seen (or imagined) from a high vantage point. In J M Gandy's perspective of the Bank of England (see illustration at the beginning of this article), Gandy portrayed the building as a picturesque ruin in order to show the internal plan arrangement, a precursor of the cutaway view.

A montage image is produced by superimposing a perspective image of a building on to a photographic background. Care is needed to record the position from which the photograph was taken, and to generate the perspective using the same viewpoint. This technique is popular in computer visualization, where the building can be photorealistically rendered, and the final image is intended to be almost indistinguishable from a photograph.

Sketches and diagrams

A sketch is a rapidly executed freehand drawing, a quick way to record and develop an idea, not intended as a finished work. A diagram could also be drawn freehand but deals with symbols, to develop the logic of a design. Both can be worked up into a more presentable form and used to communicate the principles of a design.

In architecture, the finished work is expensive and time consuming, so it is important to resolve the design as fully as possible before construction work begins. Complex modern buildings involve a large team of different specialist disciplines, and communication at the early design stages is essential to keep the design moving towards a coordinated outcome. Architects (and other designers) start investigating a new design with sketches and diagrams, to develop a rough design that provides an adequate response to the particular design problems.

There are two basic elements to a building design, the aesthetic and the practical. The aesthetic element includes the layout and visual appearance, the anticipated feel of the materials, and cultural references that will influence the way people perceive the building. Practical concerns include space allocated for different activities, how people enter and move around the building, daylight and artificial lighting, acoustics, traffic noise, legal matters and building codes, and many other issues. While both aspects are partly a matter of customary practice, every site is different. Many architects actively seek innovation, thereby increasing the number of problems to be resolved.

Architectural legend often refers to designs made on the back of an envelope or on a napkin. Initial thoughts are important, even if they have to be discarded along the way, because they provide the central idea around which the design can develop. Although a sketch is inaccurate, it is disposable and allows for freedom of thought, for trying different ideas quickly. Choice becomes sharply reduced once the design is committed to a scale drawing, and the sketch stage is almost always essential.

Diagrams are mainly used to resolve practical matters. In the early phases of the design architects use diagrams to develop, explore, and communicate ideas and solutions. They are essential tools for thinking, problem solving, and communication in the design disciplines. Diagrams can be used to resolve spatial relationships, but they can also represent forces and flows, e.g. the forces of sun and wind, or the flows of people and materials through a building.

An exploded view diagram shows component parts dis-assembled in some way, so that each can be seen on its own. These views are common in technical manuals, but are also used in architecture, either in conceptual diagrams or to illustrate technical details. In a cutaway view parts of the exterior are omitted to show the interior, or details of internal construction. Although common in technical illustration, including many building products and systems, the cutaway is in fact little-used in architectural drawing.

Types
Architectural drawings are produced for a specific purpose, and can be classified accordingly. Several elements are often included on the same sheet, for example a sheet showing a plan together with the principal façade.

Presentation drawings
Drawings intended to explain a scheme and to promote its merits. Working drawings may include tones or hatches to emphasize different materials, but they are diagrams, not intended to appear realistic. Basic presentation drawings typically include people, vehicles and trees, taken from a library of such images, and are otherwise very similar in style to working drawings. Rendering is the art of adding surface textures and shadows to show the visual qualities of a building more realistically. An architectural illustrator or graphic designer may be employed to prepare specialist presentation images, usually perspectives or highly finished site plans, floor plans and elevations etc.

Survey drawings
Measured drawings of existing land, structures and buildings. Architects need an accurate set of survey drawings as a basis for their working drawings, to establish exact dimensions for the construction work. Surveys are usually measured and drawn up by specialist land surveyors.

Record drawings
Historically, architects have made record drawings in order to understand and emulate the great architecture known to them. In the Renaissance, architects from all over Europe studied and recorded the remains of the Roman and Greek civilizations, and used these influences to develop the architecture of the period. Records are made both individually, for local purposes, and on a large scale for publication. Historic surveys worth referring to include:
 Colen Campbell's Vitruvius Brittanicus, illustrations of English buildings by Inigo Jones and Sir Christopher Wren, as well as Campbell himself and other prominent architects of the era.
 The Survey of London, founded in 1894 by Charles Robert Ashbee and now available through English Heritage. A record of notable streets and individual buildings in the former County of London.
 Historic American Buildings Survey, records of notable buildings drawn up during the 1930s Depression, this collection is held by the Library of Congress and is available copyright-free on the internet.

Record drawings are also used in construction projects, where "as-built" conditions of the completed building are documented to take account of all the variations made during the course of construction.

Working drawings

A comprehensive set of drawings used in a building construction project: these will include not only architect's drawings, but structural and other engineering drawings as well. Working drawings logically subdivide into location, assembly and component drawings.
 Location drawings, also called general arrangement drawings, include floor plans, sections and elevations: they show where the construction elements are located.
 Assembly drawings show how the different parts are put together. For example, a wall detail will show the layers that make up the construction, how they are fixed to structural elements, how to finish the edges of openings, and how prefabricated components are to be fitted.
 Component drawings enable self-contained elements e.g. windows and doorsets, to be fabricated in a workshop, and delivered to site complete and ready for installation. Larger components may include roof trusses, cladding panels, cupboards and kitchens. Complete rooms, especially hotel bedrooms and bathrooms, may be made as prefabricated pods complete with internal decorations and fittings.
Formerly, working drawings would typically combine plans, sections, elevations and some details to provide a complete explanation of a building on one sheet. That was possible because little detail was included, the building techniques involved being common knowledge amongst building professionals. Modern working drawings are much more detailed and it is standard practice to isolate select areas of the project on separate sheets. Notes included on drawings are brief, referring to standardized specification documents for more information. Understanding the layout and construction of a modern building involves studying an often-sizeable set of drawings and documents.

Drafting

Until the latter part of the 20th century, all architectural drawings were manually produced, if not by the architects, then by trained (but less skilled) draftsmen (or drafters), who did not generate the design, but did make many of the less important decisions. This system has continued with CAD drafting: many design architects have little or no knowledge of CAD software programmes, relying upon others to take their designs beyond the sketch stage. Draftsmen often specialize in a type of structure, such as residential or commercial, or in a type of construction: timber frame, reinforced concrete, prefabrication, etc.

The traditional tools of the architect were the drawing board or drafting table, T-square and set squares, protractor, compasses, pencil, and drawing pens of different types. Drawings were made on vellum, coated linen, and tracing paper. Lettering would either be done by hand, mechanically using a stencil, or a combination of the two. Ink lines were drawn with a ruling pen, a relatively sophisticated device similar to a dip-in pen, but with adjustable line width, capable of producing a very fine controlled line width. Ink pens had to be dipped into ink frequently. Draftsmen worked standing up, keeping the ink on a separate table to avoid spilling ink on the drawing.

Developments in the 20th century included the parallel motion drawing board, as well as more complex improvements on the basic T-square. The development of reliable technical drawing pens allowed for faster drafting and stenciled lettering. Letraset dry transfer lettering and half-tone sheets were popular from the 1970s until computers made those processes obsolete.

CGI and computer-aided design

Computer-aided design (generally referred to by the acronym CAD) is the use of computer software to create drawings. Today the vast majority of technical drawings of all kinds are made using CAD. Instead of drawing lines on paper, the computer records equivalent information electronically. There are many advantages to this system: repetition is reduced because complex elements can be copied, duplicated and stored for re-use. Errors can be deleted, and the speed of drafting allows many permutations to be tried before the design is finalized. On the other hand, CAD drawing encourages a proliferation of detail and increased expectations of accuracy, aspects which reduce the efficiency originally expected from the move to computerization.

Professional CAD software such as AutoCAD is complex and requires both training and experience before the operator becomes fully productive. Consequently, skilled CAD operators are often divorced from the design process. Simpler software such as SketchUp and Vectorworks allows for more intuitive drawing and is intended as a design tool.

CAD is used to create all kinds of drawings, from working drawings to photorealistic perspective views. Architectural renderings (also called visualizations) are made by creating a three-dimensional model using CAD. The model can be viewed from any direction to find the most useful viewpoints. Different software (for example Autodesk 3ds Max) is then used to apply color and texture to surfaces, and to represent shadows and reflections. The result can be accurately combined with photographic elements: people, cars, background landscape.

Building Information Modeling
Building information modeling (BIM) is the logical development of CAD drawing, a relatively new technology but fast becoming mainstream. The design team collaborates to create a three-dimensional computer model, and all plans and other two-dimensional views are generated directly from the model, ensuring spatial consistency. The key innovation here is to share the model via the internet, so that all the design functions (site survey, architecture, structure and services) can be integrated into a single model, or as a series of models associated with each specialism that are shared throughout the design development process. Some form of management, not necessarily by the architect, needs to be in place to resolve conflicting priorities. The starting point of BIM is spatial design, but it also enables components to be quantified and scheduled directly from the information embedded in the model.. Building information modelling can be characterized into 3 different levels ranging from 0-3. These levels represent BIM maturity and distinguishes the amount of cooperation in projects. They gauge information being shared throughout the whole process.

Level 0 is individualized with no collaboration. Individuals are working on their own CAD files separately and working using their own standards. These are known to be more traditional ways which are being phased out therefore no longer being used today.

Level 1 is a mixture of 3D and 2D work. Project teams are required to manage and share data amongst the team. Aspects such as “naming conventions” should be adopted.

Level 2 involves all team members using 3D models. Although they might not being using the same information, the built environment is shared through a similar file formats. This level also introduces construction sequencing and cost.

Level 3 involves working on a shared project model. The model exists in a central environment and can be modified  by everyone. Conflicting information is reduced due to real time update on models. Later levels include sequencing components, cost estimation and accounting for upfront costs.

Parametric Design 
Parametric design is an example of computer intelligence rising in the field of architecture. It is the creation of complex relationships between models. Measurements in parametric design connect by scripts. Users can adjust and adapt their models based on measurements. Changing one measurement will affect other measurements based on the set parameters. The parametric design uses scalability and adjustments which involve complex organic shapes. It allows for the creation of forms that would not be possible with regular 3d modeling or would take copious amounts of time. Models can decrease production time, therefore, allowing for the time allotted to other times of the design process. An argument with parametric design is the question of practicality. At times, it is unsure whether or not these styles  properly comply with users wants and needs. Real-life examples of parametric designs would be The Metropol Parasol in Seville or the Canton in Guangzhou China. These forms have a commonality with complex repetitive patterns which twist, bend and curve in dramatic ways. These lattices are unique and there is a complexity tied with how they look. This is coined as “parametricism” by Zaha Hadid which is a style based on digital animation techniques.

Architectural animation

An architectural animation is a short film showing how a proposed building will look: the moving image makes three-dimensional forms much easier to understand. An animation is generated from a series of hundreds or even thousands of still images, each made in the same way as an architectural visualization. A computer-generated building is created using a CAD programs, and that is used to create more or less realistic views from a sequence of viewpoints. The simplest animations use a moving viewpoint, while more complex animations can include moving objects: people, vehicles, and so on.

Digital era in architecture 
Schools are producing well versed architecture students who perform in computer assisted collaboration, construction automation and intelligent buildings which promise to have as much impact before the adaptation of technologies. It’s important to understand that architects are problem solvers and critical thinking which has been used since the dawn of man is still being carried on. The idea of innovation, responsiveness and critical thinking will never be “phased out” and always relevant today. Although pure drafting, which involves manually drawing plans for construction, are not being used as often because of CAD, they are training architects to exercise human centered designer and to dive deeper into the culture to ultimately understand clientele. Human centered design involves the human perspective in all steps of the design process.The unpredictability and complexity of humans are unmatched with any pre-programmed systems.

Virtual Reality 
Virtual reality in architectural projects helps designers understand spaces from a cognitive perspective. VR stands for virtual reality and explains an experience in a world that doesn't exist. Virtual reality creates an experience generated by a computer program. The use of motion tracking allows for quick manipulation. It creates an individual secluded experience. Architecture firms are using this as a tool to allow employees to learn and create a more engaging experience for both clients and employees. Benefits of VR for architecture include low start-up costs, gaining a competitive edge, avoiding revision, and the duplication of real-world scenarios. By placing a client into the virtual world, the feedback is often more straight forward as the client can walk through based on their needs and aesthetic choices.

Online Practices 
Due to COVID-19. architecture firms have increasingly shifted to a digital environment for collaboration. Video conferencing is proving to be a popular way of meeting with clients and simulating the studio environment. Collaboration and communication using programs like Zoom are common consistently being used. Since the beginning of the epidemic, people are expected to be increasingly well versed with technology. Although coordination is often difficult, programs like BIM help improve workflow between both architects clients. However, relationships with clients are harder to facilitate because clients are not able to touch or feel the work. Adaptation is critical as more and more programs are being implemented among the studio to support staff.

Architectural reprographics

Reprographics or reprography covers a variety of technologies, media, and support services used to make multiple copies of original drawings. Prints of architectural drawings are still sometimes called blueprints, after one of the early processes which produced a white line on blue paper. The process was superseded by the dye-line print system which prints black on white coated paper (Whiteprint). The standard modern processes are the ink-jet printer, laser printer and photocopier, of which the ink-jet and laser printers are commonly used for large-format printing. Although colour printing is now commonplace, it remains expensive above A3 size, and architect's working drawings still tend to adhere to the black and white / greyscale aesthetic.

See also

 Architectural model
 Copyright in architecture in the United States
 Drawing
 Engineering drawing
 Layers in a standard architectural drawing
 Linear scale
 List of museums with major collections of European prints and drawings
 Museum for Architectural Drawing, Berlin, Germany
 Multiview orthographic projection
 Preservation: Library and Archival Science
 Structural drawing
 Technical drawing

References

Drawing
Technical drawing